Eugene Tallmadge Wilson (December 11, 1852 – November 17, 1923) was an American politician in the state of Washington. He served in the Washington State Senate from 1889 to 1893. From 1891 to 1893, he was President pro tempore of the Senate. He later resided in Montana, where he was a bank receiver. He died unexpectedly in Tacoma, Washington in 1923.

References

External links

1852 births
1923 deaths
Politicians from Madison, Wisconsin
Republican Party Washington (state) state senators